Skinny Melon And Me is a 1996 children's novel by Jean Ure. It is mainly the diary of pre-teen Cherry, and includes observations of her mum, new stepfather, and best friend, Melanie Skinner (Skinny Melon).

Publication history
1996, England, HarperCollins 
The Tutti-Frutti Collection, 2005, England, HarperCollins  
2001, USA, Henry Holt 
2011, England, HarperCollins

Reception
A review by Children's Books Ireland of Skinny Melon And Me wrote "Cherry's voice is both funny and genuinely touching as the reader watches her emotionally mature over the course of the book.", and Kirkus Reviews called it "brightly chatty".

Skinny Melon And Me has also been reviewed by School Librarian, School Library Journal, Booklist, Publishers Weekly, Library Talk, and Horn Book Guides.

References

External links

Library holdings of Skinny Melon And Me

1996 novels
1996 children's books
English novels
Fictional diaries
HarperCollins books